1982 in professional wrestling describes the year's events in the world of professional wrestling.

List of notable promotions 
These promotions held notable shows in 1982.

Calendar of notable shows

Accomplishments and tournaments

AJPW

NJPW

Awards and honors

Pro Wrestling Illustrated

Wrestling Observer Newsletter

Births
January 8 - Bad Luck Fale 
January 13  
 Jason Ayers
 Mason Ryan 
January 25 - Z-Barr (d. 2020) 
January 27 - Zeus 
February 4 - Chris Sabin 
February 10 - Vanessa Kraven 
February 14 - Ray (d.2018)
February 19 - Mascarita Dorada 
February 25 – Maria Kanellis
March 7 - Cody Deaner 
March 20 - Kasey James 
March 24  
 Epico Colón
 Jack Swagger
April 2 – Jack Evans
April 7 – Sonjay Dutt 
April 16 - Joe Doering 
April 26 – Amazing Red 
April 29 – Aksana
May 21 - Kota Ibushi 
May 27 – Natalya Neidhart
June 4 - Alpha Female 
June 6 – Gunner
June 11 - Egotistico Fantastico
July 1 - Carmella DeCesare 
July 11 - Jeff Cobb 
July 13 - Chris Ca$h (d. 2005)
July 15 - Towel Boy 
July 19 - Daniel Quirk (d. 2005)
July 28 - Cain Velasquez 
August 3: 
Damien Sandow
Nyla Rose 
August 17 – Cheerleader Melissa
August 25 – Mictlan
September 12 - Sal Rinauro 
September 20 – Sexy Star
September 26 - Damian Priest 
October 1 - Sakamoto
October 10 - Tony Khan 
October 12 - Tama Tonga
October 16 - Devon Nicholson 
October 18 - Simon Gotch 
October 28 - Rocky Romero
November 1 - L. A. Knight 
November 8 – Ted DiBiase Jr.
November 9 - Nick Mitchell  
November 17 - Mirai (d. 2005) 
December 8 - Jimmy Rave (d. 2021)
December 17 - Lionheart (d. 2019) 
December 21 – Primo
December 22 – Místico

Debuts
Uncertain debut date
Bob Bradley 
Brickhouse Brown
Phil Lafon
Sherri Martel
Mean Mike 
Nailz 
Ricky Santana
Johnny Smith
Tracey Smothers
Al Snow
Steve Williams
Kazuo Yamazaki
La Parka
January 2 - Arn Anderson
August 10 - Billy Jack Haynes
October 18 - El Hijo Del Santo
November - Road Warrior Animal
December 11 - George South

Retirements
Buddy Rogers (1939 - 1982)
Santo (1934 - 1982)
Fritz Von Erich (1953 - 1982)
 George Gulas (1974-1982)
Killer Karl Kox (1956 - 1982)
Johnny Powers (1960 - 1982)
Karl Gotch (1950s - January 1, 1982)
Mick McManus (1947 - 1982)
Mighty Joe Thunder (1957-1982) 
Rip Hawk (1949 - 1982)

Deaths
March 6- Bob Konovsky, 47
June 12 - Peter Maivia, 45
July 25 - Shag Thomas, 56
July 27 - Kasavubu, 26
July 29 - Harold Sakata, 62
August 28 - Bearcat Wright, 50
September 5 - Dick Lane, 83 
September 24 - Jack O'Brien 
December 12 -  Bill Longson, 76
December 13, George Gadaski, 52 
December 15 - Chatti Yokouchi, 45

References

 
professional wrestling